The women's team time trial of the 1991 UCI Road World Championships cycling event took place on 21 August 1991 in Stuttgart, Germany. The course was 49.55 km long.

Final classification

Source

References

1991 UCI Road World Championships
UCI Road World Championships – Women's team time trial
UCI